Philip Humphrey Garland  (9 February 1942 – 15 March 2017) was a New Zealand folk musician. He was awarded the Queen's Service Medal in the 2014 Queen's Birthday Honours for services to folk music, and was called the "Godfather of New Zealand folk music". He recorded 19 albums, and won the New Zealand Music Awards folk album of the year three times.

Garland died in Hamilton on 15 March 2017, aged 75, and was buried in the Rutherford Street (Woolston) Cemetery, Christchurch.

Discography
 A Sense of Place
 Billycan Ballads
 Colonial Yesterdays 
 Damper, Duff & Doughboys 
 Down A Country Road
 How Are You, Mate? 
 Hunger In The Air 
 No Place Like Home 
 One Hundred Years Ago 
 Southern Odyssey 
 Springtime In The Mountain 
 Swag o’ Dreams 
 Under The Southern Cross 
 Wind In The Tussock 
 The Phil Garland Songbook

Books
 Faces in the Firelight

References

1942 births
2017 deaths
Musicians from Christchurch
New Zealand folk musicians
Recipients of the Queen's Service Medal
Burials at Woolston Cemetery